Il colore nascosto delle cose is a 2017 Italian drama film directed by Silvio Soldini. It was screened out of competition at the 74th Venice International Film Festival.

Cast
 Valeria Golino as Emma
 Adriano Giannini as Teo

References

External links
 

2017 films
2017 drama films
Italian drama films
2010s Italian-language films
Films directed by Silvio Soldini
Films about blind people
2010s Italian films